The Ice Palace is a 6,000-seat multi-purpose arena in Cherepovets, Russia.  It was opened in 2007.  It replaced Sports-Concert Hall Almaz as the home of Russian ice hockey team Severstal Cherepovets.

History
The decision to build a new ice arena was made in 2003. It was first announced by the governor of the Vologda Region Vyacheslav Pozgalev at the opening of the hockey season on September 12, 2003 after Severstal's victory over Metallurg Novokuznetsk. April 8, 2005 Vyacheslav Pozgalev took part in the ceremony of laying the first stone.

The palace was built by Skanska, which has previously been involved in the construction of ice sports complexes in St. Petersburg and Yaroslavl. At first, the sports complex was supposed to be called "Olympic", but this name was not liked by many Cherepovets and the International Olympic Committee.

On November 4, 2006, on the Day of the City of Cherepovets, the Ice Palace received its first visitors. Honored Master of Sports Vladislav Tretyak, President of the Russian Ski Racing Federation Vladimir Loginov were guests of honor at the opening ceremony. Olympic champions in figure skating Tatyana Navka and Roman Kostomarov took part in the gala concert.

The first hockey match at the new arena took place on November 15, 2006 between the teams Severstal and Siberia and ended with a score of 5:3 in favor of the hosts.

List of Celebrities Venues in Arena

 Danko
 Lesopoval
 Mikhail Shufutinsky
 Igor Nikolayev
 Lyube
 Edwin Marton
 Vladimir Kuzmin
 Lera Masskva
 Korni band
 band Fabrika
 Ottawan
 Sergey Minayev
 Bad Boys Blue
 Eros Band
 Alexander Buinov
 Nikolai Noskov
 band Bi-2
 MakSim
 band Mirage
 Technology band
 Morandi
 Accent
 group Zolotoe_Koltso
 Boney M.
 Stas Mikhailov
 Grigory Leps
 Mashina Vremeni
 Group DDT 
 Philip Kirkorov
 Group "Leningrad"

External links
 Official website of Ice Palace
 Photos of new arena

Source
This page has been translated from Russian wikipedia, article Ледовый дворец (Череповец), version 121882230.

Indoor ice hockey venues in Russia
Indoor arenas in Russia
Music venues in Russia
Severstal Cherepovets
Buildings and structures in Vologda Oblast
Kontinental Hockey League venues